The 1990 World Snooker Championship (also referred to as the 1990 Embassy World Snooker Championship for the purposes of sponsorship) was a professional snooker tournament that took place between 13 and 29 April 1990 at the Crucible Theatre in Sheffield, England. It was the ninth and final world ranking tournament of the 1989–90 snooker season following the European Open. Featuring a total prize fund of £620,000, the winner received £120,000; and was sponsored by cigarette manufacturer Embassy.

The defending champion was Steve Davis, who won the previous year's final 18–3 over John Parrott. Davis reached the semi-finals of the event, where he was defeated 14-16 by Jimmy White. White contested the final against Stephen Hendry who defeated Parrott in the other semi-final 16–11. Hendry led 9–7 after the first day's play and won the first four frames of the second day to lead 13–7, before White reduced the gap to four frames. At 16–12, Hendry compiled breaks of 81 and 71 to win the match 18–12, claiming his first world title. In so doing, he became the youngest-ever world champion at the age of 21 years and 106 days. There was a total of 18 century breaks made during the tournament, the highest of which being a 140 made by Parrott.

Overview
The World Snooker Championship is an annual professional snooker tournament organised by the World Professional Billiards and Snooker Association (WPBSA). Founded in the late 19th century by British Army soldiers stationed in India, the cue sport was popular in the British Isles. However, in the modern era, which started in 1969 when the World Championship reverted to a knockout format, it has become increasingly popular worldwide, especially in East and Southeast Asian nations such as China, Hong Kong and Thailand.

Joe Davis won the first World Championship in 1927, hosted by the Billiards Association and Control Council, the final match being held at Camkin's Hall in Birmingham, England. Since 1977, the event has been held at the Crucible Theatre in Sheffield, England. The 1990 championship featured 32 professional players competing in one-on-one snooker matches in a single-elimination format, each match played over several . These competitors in the main tournament were selected using a combination of the top players in the snooker world rankings and the winners of a pre-tournament qualification stage. The top 16 players in the world rankings automatically qualified for the event, the remaining 16 players coming through the qualification rounds.

Prize fund 
The winner of the event received £120,000 from a total prize fund of £620,000.The breakdown of prize money for this year is shown below: 

Winner: £120,000
Runner-up: £72,000
Semi-final: £36,000
Quarter-final: £18,000
Last 16: £9,000
Last 32: £5,000
Stage one highest break: £3,000.
Stage two highest break: £12,000
Stage two maximum break: £100,000
Total: £620,000

Tournament summary

First round
1957 World finalist Jackie Rea Lost in the 2nd Qualifying round and announced his retirement from professional snooker.
There where 4 debutants at the crucible this year, but all lost in the opening round. Tony Chappel (In his only crucible appearance) and Nigel Gilbert who both lost 10–4 to Tony Knowles and Terry Griffiths respectively. They were joined by two Canadians Alain Robidoux (lost 10–7 to Hendry) and Brady Gollan who won 5 matches just to qualify and led veteran Doug Mountjoy 8-7 before losing the last 3 frames.
Fan favorite, attacking player Cliff Wilson made his 8th and final crucible appearance at the age of 55. He never got past the world championship 1st round in his career and that run was not to change as he was edged out 10-6 by "the grinder" Cliff Thorburn.
Hendry compiled a break of 58 to win that frame, and added the following two frames to progress 10–7.
John Parrott trailed Mark Bennett 7–9, but took the next two to force a  that he won on the  after a break of 69 after being 59 points behind.
Two time world champion (1972, 1982) Alex Higgins returned to the Crucible after missing out the previous year. He lost 5–10 to Steve James in the first round. After the match, Higgins punched an official in the stomach at the post-match press conference; this, alongside a threat to have Dennis Taylor shot at the 1990 World Cup a month earlier, led to Higgins being banned for the entire 1990/1991 season.
 In the first round match between James and Higgins, James was awarded a free ball in a frame before any reds had been potted. In taking a baulk colour as an extra  and compiling a total clearance of 135 the break became the only  at the Crucible.

Semi-finals
 For the only time since seeding began, the four semi-finalists were also the top four seeds.
 For the first time since 1982, Davis failed to reach the final, losing 14–16 to Jimmy White in the semi-final. It was the first time White had defeated Davis at the Crucible after Davis had eliminated White in four previous encounters. From 6–8 at the close of the second session, White won seven of the eight frames in the third session to lead 13–9.
 In beating John Parrott at the semi-final stage, Hendry replaced Steve Davis as snooker's world number 1. Parrott has led 4–0, and was 5–3 ahead at the end of their first session. Hendry won the next six frames to lead 9–5, followed by Parrott winning six consecutive frames leaving Hendry 9–11 behind. Hendry won the last two frames of the third session to equalise at 11–11, and added the first five frames of the fourth session to complete a 16–11 victory/

Final
Hendry led 9–7 after the first day. On the second day, he won the first four frames, making a break of 104 in the second, with White failing to pot a ball in three of them. From 7–13, White took the 21st frame with a break of 82, and added the following frame to reduce his deficit to 9–13. In the 23rd frame, White led by 63 points before Hendry produced a clearance of 72 to win on the black ball. The session finished with Hendry 14–10 ahead after White won the session's last frame with breaks of 51 and 45. The first three frames of the fourth session were completed in 27 minutes, and included a 108 clearance by Hendry. White took the following frame, before breaks of 71 and 81 secured a first world championship title for Hendry. He became the youngest-ever world champion at the age of 21 years and 106 days, overtaking Alex Higgins, who had won the 1972 World Snooker Championship a few days before his 23rd birthday.

Hendry commented after his win that "I was determined to win and confident that I could do it. I was glad I was able to keep my concentration and cope with the pressure. All through the match I was nervous. My stomach was churning tonight." White said that he was disappointed with the standard of his own safety play during the match, and added "I'm a little bit sick but I can honestly say I enjoyed the game. In a way I'm pleased for Stephen. He's a great kid and he puts in enough work to be world champion. He played tremendous snooker. You could count his misses on one hand." Hendry went on to win six more world titles, including further victories over White in the 1992, 1993 and 1994 finals.

Main draw 
Shown below are the results for each round. The numbers in parentheses beside some of the players are their seeding ranks (each championship has 16 seeds and 16 qualifiers).

Qualifying
Players in bold denote match winners.

Century breaks
There were 18 century breaks in the championship. The highest break was 140 made by John Parrott.

 140  John Parrott
 135  Steve James
 131, 100  Terry Griffiths
 128  Cliff Thorburn
 118, 117, 112  Steve Davis
 117, 108, 108, 106, 104, 103  Stephen Hendry
 109  Willie Thorne
 105  Jimmy White
 104  Darren Morgan
 102  Tony Drago

Qualifying stages
There were 22 century breaks in the qualifying stages; the highest, 135, was made by Nigel Gilbert in his fifth round defeat of David Roe.

 135, 131  Nigel Gilbert
 133  Neal Foulds
 131, 105  Mick Price
 126, 109, 101  Mark Johnston-Allen
 123  Danny Fowler
 120  Ray Reardon
 117  Tony Chappel
 113  Brian Morgan
 111  Ken Owers
 110, 110, 106, 101  Alain Robidoux
 110  Robert Marshall
 107  Tony Kearney
 105  Nigel Bond
 104  Steve Duggan
 100  Tommy Murphy

References

World Snooker Championships
World Championship
World Snooker Championship
Sports competitions in Sheffield
World Snooker Championship